Lisa Karlina Lumongdong (born 23 July 1968) is an Indonesian chess player who holds the title of Woman International Master (WIM). She is a two-times Indonesian Women's Chess Championship winner (1994, 2005).

Biography
She twice won Indonesian Women's Chess Championship: in 1994 and 2005. In 1993, Lisa Karlina Lumongdong participated in Women's World Chess Championship Interzonal Tournament in Jakarta where ranked 34th place. She represented Indonesia in Women's Asian Team Chess Championship in 1995. In 2005, she won the bronze medal in Women's Standard Chess Team tournament in the Southeast Asian Games.

Lisa Karlina Lumongdong played for Indonesia in the Women's Chess Olympiads:
 In 1988, at first reserve board in the 28th Chess Olympiad (women) in Thessaloniki (+4, =3, -4),
 In 1990, at second board in the 29th Chess Olympiad (women) in Novi Sad (+2, =3, -3),
 In 1992, at first board in the 30th Chess Olympiad (women) in Manila (+2, =5, -7),
 In 1994, at first board in the 31st Chess Olympiad (women) in Moscow (+2, =3, -3),
 In 1996, at third board in the 32nd Chess Olympiad (women) in Yerevan (+5, =4, -3).

In 1992, she awarded the FIDE Woman International Master (WIM) title.

References

External links

1968 births
Living people
Indonesian female chess players
Chess Woman International Masters
Chess Olympiad competitors
20th-century Indonesian women
21st-century Indonesian women